Eldon is a civil parish in Restigouche County, New Brunswick, Canada.

For governance purposes it is divided between the incorporated rural community of Kedgwick and the Restigouche rural district, both of which are members of the Restigouche Regional Service Commission.

Before the 2023 governance reform, the parish was divided into four local service districts and part of another. Mann Mountain was opposite the mouth of the Matapedia River, with Flatlands straddling the eastern border; St. Jean Baptiste – Menneval, White's Brook were both along Route 17, nearer Kedgwick than Campbellton; the LSD of the parish of Eldon comprised the remainder of the parish. In the reform, Kedgwick annexed the community of Wyers Brook, properties on either side of Route 17 south from Glenwood, and all of the parish to the west; the remainder became part of the rural district.

Origin of name
The parish was named in honour of the Earl of Eldon, Lord High Chancellor of Great Britain at the time of its erection.

History
Eldon was erected in 1827 from Beresford Parish. Eldon comprised Restigouche County west of the Upsalquitch River, with the county line being a prolongation of the western boundary of Northumberland County.

In 1840 the eastern boundary was altered to run due south from the mouth of the Upsalquitch.

In 1852 the western county line was changed to its current location; Eldon's western line moved with it.

In 1879 Eldon was dissolved and its territory added to Addington Parish.

In 1896 Eldon was reërected from Addington, with the eastern line now further east in its modern configuration.

In 1916 the western part of Eldon was erected as Grimmer Parish. Grimmer included what is now Saint-Quentin Parish.

Boundaries
Eldon Parish is bounded:

 on the north by the Quebec boundary, running through the Restigouche River;
 on the east by a line beginning near the lower end of Bell Island, on the eastern line of a grant to John Johnson, then running southeasterly along the Johnston grant and its prolongation, with a slight bend, to the northeastern corner of a grant to James Dunn on the northern side of Evergreen Road, then along the Dunn grant and its prolongation to a point about 1 kilometre west of Route 17 and 2 kilometres south of Evergreen Road, then running true south to the county line;
 on the south by the Northumberland and Victoria County lines;
 on the west by a line beginning on the county line about 525 metres south of O'Dare Brook and about 3 kilometres west of the Tobique River, then running north-northwesterly in a straight line to the mouth of Upper Thorn Point Brook on the Restigouche;
 including the river islands in front of the parish.

Communities
Communities at least partly within the parish.

 Adams Gulch
 Dawsonville
 Glenwood
 Mann Mountain Settlement
 Mann Siding
 Menneval
 Millerville
 Robinsonville
 Saint-Jean-Baptiste-de-Restigouche
 Squaw Cap
 Upsalquitch
 Whites Brook
 Wyers Brook

Bodies of water
Bodies of water at least partly within the parish.

 Left Hand Branch Mamozekel River
 Northwest Upsalquitch River
 Restigouche River
 Tobique River
 Upsalquitch River
 Burntland Lake
 Lac du Petit-Vingt-Deux
 Eighteen Mile Lake
 McKenzie Lake
 Nictau Lake
 Poison Lake

Islands
Islands at least partly within the parish.

 Adams Island
 Almons Island
 Bell Island
 Cross Point Island
 Croswell Island
 England Island
 Gilmores Island
 Mann Island
 Marshall Island
 Marshalls Island
 McAndrews Island
 McDougalls Island
 Mink Island
 Mocklers Island
 Pine Island
 Poker Island
 Taylor Island
 Walker Island

Other notable places
Parks, historic sites, and other noteworthy places at least partly within the parish.
 Mount Carleton Provincial Park

Demographics

Population

Language

Access Routes
Highways and numbered routes that run through the parish, including external routes that start or finish at the parish limits:

Highways

Principal Routes

Secondary Routes:

External Routes:
 (Quebec)

See also
List of parishes in New Brunswick

Notes

References

Parishes of Restigouche County, New Brunswick
Local service districts of Restigouche County, New Brunswick